Petros Avetisyan (born 7 January 1996) is an Armenian football player who currently plays midfielder for Kazakhstan Premier League club FC Maktaaral.

Career

Club

Banants
Born in Yerevan, Avetisyan started his career at Malatia football school that later was renamed as FC Banants. After progressing through the club's youth system, he became top scorer of Banants-2 in Armenian First league in 2014/15 season and moved to the first team of the club.

On 11 November 2014 he made his debut in Armenia Premier League in away match against Pyunik. In two weeks he already was in starting line-up of Banants.

In 2015/16 he was one of the key players of Banants. The club won the Armenian Cup.

Pyunik
On 29 July 2016, Avetisyan signed for Pyunik on a 6-month loan deal, and played almost all the matches in Starting line-up of the club in the first half of 2016/17 season.

On 23 January 2017, he officially was transferred from Banants to Pyunik.

At the beginning of 2018 he was linked to moving to Ukrainian clubs FC Zorya Luhansk and FC Oleksandriya.

Ararat-Armenia
On 27 February 2019, Ararat-Armenia announced the signing of Petros Avetisyan. Avetisyan made his Ararat-Armenia debut on 2 March 2019 in a 4–1 Premier League home win against Ararat Yerevan. He entered the pitch in 55th minute and scored his first Ararat-Armenia goal in 90th minute. In the same season, Avetisyan won to the title of Armenian Premier League with Ararat-Armenia and became champion of Armenia for the first time.

Tobol
On 12 January 2020, Ararat-Armenia announced that Avetisyan had moved to FC Tobol in the Kazakhstan Premier League, with Tobol confirming the signing on 14 January 2020. He made his debut for FC Tobol on 14 March 2020 in Kazakhstan Premier League Matchday 2 fixture against Zhetysu, as a 90th-minute substitute for Serikzhan Muzhikov. He became Kazakhstan vice-champion with Tobol. On 19 January 2021, Tobol confirmed that Avetisyan had left the club.

Noah
On 27 February 2021, Avetisyan returned to the Armenian Premier League, signing for FC Noah. He helped his club with 5 goals to reach the second position in the league.

Shakhter Karagandy
On 16 February 2022, Petros Avetisyan signed a contract with Kazakhstan Premier League club Shakhter Karagandy. On 18 July 2022, Shakhter Karagandy announced the departure of Avetisyan by mutual agreement.

Akzhayik
On 20 August 2022, Petros Avetisyan signed a contract with Kazakhstan Premier League club FC Akzhayik. On the same day he scored his first goal for Akzhayik making it 2-0 in the game with Caspiy.

FC Maktaaral
On 05 March 2023, Petros Avetisyan signed a contract with Kazakhstan Premier League club FC Maktaaral.

International
Avetisyan made his debut in Armenia national under-21 football team on 8 September 2015 in a home match against Romania.

On 3 November 2016 he was called up to Armenia national football team for the first time.

On 13 June 2017 he scored his first goal for Armenia national under-21 football team as captain. It was against Gibraltar U21 in UEFA U21 Championship Qualifying Round of 2019 in Estádio Algarve, Portugal.

He made his debut for the senior squad on 26 March 2019 in a Euro 2020 qualifier against Finland, as a 74th-minute substitute for Edgar Babayan.

Career statistics

Club

International

Statistics accurate as of match played 18 November 2019

Honours

Club 
Banants
 Armenian Cup Winner: 2015-16
 Armenian Supercup Winner: 2014-15
Ararat-Armenia
 Armenian Premier League Winner: 2018-19
 Armenian Supercup Winner: 2019-20

References

External links 
 
 
 

1996 births
Footballers from Yerevan
Living people
Armenian footballers
Armenia under-21 international footballers
Armenia international footballers
Association football midfielders
FC Urartu players
FC Pyunik players
FC Ararat-Armenia players
Armenian Premier League players